On the Adamant is a 2023 French-language documentary film directed by Nicolas Philibert. The work portrays the floating structure L'Adamant Day Center, located on the Seine river in Paris. The structure is a special daycare center for the treatment of adults with mental disorders.

It won the Golden Bear at the 73rd Berlin International Film Festival, where it had its world premiere on 24 February 2023. The film was also nominated for the Berlinale Documentary Film Award. , it is scheduled for release in French cinemas on 19 April 2023.

Content
The film is a portrait of the L'Adamant Day Center in Paris. This is a floating building located at the foot of the Charles de Gaulle Bridge on the right bank of the Seine. The unique daycare center welcomes adults with mental disorders from the first four arrondissements of Paris. It offers patients a daily routine that is structured in terms of time and space and helps them to regain their footing in everyday life with therapeutic workshops and psychosocial rehabilitation support. The Adamant team consists of psychiatrists, psychologists, nurses, occupational therapists, specialist educators, psychomotor specialists, care coordinators, hospital staff, and various external artists and art therapists.

Production

The director Nicolas Philibert was aware of the project of the Adamant in the early 2010s through psychologist and psychoanalyst Linda de Zitter, whom he had known since the filming of La Moindre des choses in 1995. Seven or eight years later, when the project was completed, he met a workshop group at L’Adamant on their invitation and as he said, "I came away particularly invigorated, spurred on by the remarks of the people who were there." So, when he planned to make the documentary he was free of worries about the architecture of the film, he was convinced that the unity of place and the 'characters' would allow him an undisciplined construction, as he said "Following a character, losing him, finding him later, filming a meeting, a workshop, welcoming a newcomer, informal exchanges... And fixing all those little details that we might find trivial and which would become the very fabric of the film being made."

Release
On the Adamant premiered on 24 February 2023 as part of the 73rd Berlin International Film Festival, in competition. , it is scheduled for release in French cinemas on 19 April 2023.

Reception
On the review aggregator Rotten Tomatoes website, the film has an approval rating of 100% based on 9 reviews, with an average rating of 7.1/10. On Metacritic, it has a weighted average score of 75 out of 100 based on 5 reviews, indicating "generally favorable reviews".

Jordan Mintzer, for The Hollywood Reporter, stating that the film presents "an artful look at outsider artists", opined that "On the Adamant ultimately becomes a moving testament to what people are capable of, if they could just find the right place to do it." 

Guy Lodge, reviewing at the Berlin Film Festival for Variety, wrote, "On the Adamant might not achieve the crossover success Philibert has found in the past, but it’s a warm reminder of his perceptive gifts...." Fabien Lemercier reviewing for Cineuropa praised the director: "Philibert's is a supple and natural approach, both methodical and poetic, which demonstrates great human and cinematographic understanding and which smoothly and modestly establishes contact in an environment where you have to find the right keys to connect." 

Jonathan Romney for ScreenDaily wrote in a review that the film is "engaging and affirmative". Romney stated that, in contrast to the more detached observational approach of the Frederick Wiseman school, "The film is more about character and human presence, as opposed to depicting the overall functioning of this institution."

David Robb reviewing on Slant Magazine rated the film with two and a half out of four stars and opined that, "The task of representing mental illness and those afflicted by it can be a precarious tightrope walk for a documentarian ...", and appreciating the director's presentation, Robb wrote, "... and it’s to Nicolas Philibert's credit that he mostly avoids tumbling into sensationalism or mawkish sentimentality."

Accolades
While announcing the award Kristen Stewart, the jury president called the film "masterfully crafted" and a "cinematic proof of the vital necessity of human expression." Philibert asked in his acceptance speech if the jury members were "crazy" and yet nevertheless thanked them, saying "that documentary can be considered to be cinema in its own right touches me deeply."

Listicle

References

External links

 
 On the Adamant at TS Production 
 
 On the Adamant at Berlinale
 
 

2023 films
2023 documentary films
2020s French films
2020s French-language films
2020s Japanese films
Films directed by Nicolas Philibert
France 3 Cinéma films
French documentary films
Golden Bear winners
Japanese documentary films